The 2017–18 season was Morecambe's eleventh consecutive season in League Two, the fourth tier of English football. They finished 22nd in League Two, and also competed in the FA Cup, EFL Cup and EFL Trophy, where they were eliminated in the second round, first round and group stage respectively. 

The season page covers the period between 1 July 2017 and 30 June 2018.

Competitions

Friendlies
As of 26 June 2017, Morecambe have announced six pre-season friendlies against Preston North End, Rochdale, Blackburn Rovers, AFC Fylde, Bamber Bridge and Lancaster City.

League Two

League table

Result summary

Results by matchday

Matches
On 21 June 2017, the league fixtures were announced.

FA Cup
On 16 October 2017, Morecambe were drawn at home against Hartlepool United in the first round. An away fixture against Shrewsbury Towm was confirmed for the second round.

EFL Cup
On 16 June 2017, Morecambe were drawn away to Barnsley in the first round.

EFL Trophy
On 12 July 2017, the group stage draw was completed with Morecambe facing Carlisle United, Leicester City U23s and Fleetwood Town in Northern Group A.

Transfers

Transfers in

Transfers out

Loans in

Loans out

References

Morecambe F.C. seasons
Morecambe